Magos Herrera is a Japanese compilation album, by the Latin jazz Mexican singer, Magos Herrera. Released on April 21, 2004 in Japan, the album included songs from her previous albums, Orquideas Susurrantes and Pais Maravilla.

Background and theme
The album was her only release in Japan and distributed by Mecca Records, and can only be found on Amazon.com.

Track listing
 "Como Un Poeta" (As A Poet)1
 "Somos" (We Are)2
 "Pais Maravilla" (Wonderland)2
 "La Espera" (The Longing)2
 "Dennis"1
 "Xote De Manha" (Xote Of Morning)1
 "Maria de Verdad" (Mary Of True)1
 "Son Del Negrito" (Negrito "Son")1
 "Son Cotidiano" (Daily "Son")2
 "Princesa Caballero" (Princess/Knight)2
 "Luna Menguante" (Decreasing Moon)2
 "Drumme Negrita" (Cuban Lullaby)2
 "Agua" (Water)2
 "Orquideas Susurrantes" (Whispering Orchids)1
 "Serafín" (Serafin)2
 "Sauce Llorón" (Weeping willows)1
 "Necesito Un Sol" (Need A Sun)2
 "A Pureza do Mundo caín" (The World's Purity Is Falling Down)1

1 taken from the album Orquideas Susurrantes
2 taken from the album Pais Maravilla

References

Magos Herrera albums
2004 compilation albums